Ibeth Mónica Heredia Fárez (born May 10, 1991 in Morona Santiago) is a judoka from Ecuador.

In 2010, she won bronze medal at South American Games and Pan American Judo Championships both in non-Olympic Super Extra-Lightweight category to 44 kg.

Achievements

References

 

Ecuadorian female judoka
Living people
1991 births
South American Games bronze medalists for Ecuador
South American Games medalists in judo
Competitors at the 2010 South American Games
21st-century Ecuadorian women